The Arizona Department of Homeland Security (AZDOHS) is a state agency within the executive branch of the Arizona state government designed to develop, coordinate, and implement of a state policy to secure the state of Arizona from terrorist threat or attack. AZDOHS manages federal homeland security grants related to terrorism prevention and hazard management.

Arizona is divided into five homeland security regions grouped together by counties:
 Central Region: Maricopa County
 East Region: Gila, Graham, Greenlee and Pinal counties
 North Region: Apache, Coconino and Navajo counties
 South Region: Cochise, Pima, Santa Cruz and Yuma counties
 West Region: La Paz, Mohave and Yavapai counties

See also
 Arizona Counter Terrorism Information Center

References

State law enforcement agencies of Arizona
State departments of homeland security of the United States